The 2018 Active Pest Control 200 was the second stock car race of the 2018 NASCAR Camping World Truck Series season and the 13th iteration of the event. The race was held on Saturday, February 24, 2018 in Hampton, Georgia at Atlanta Motor Speedway, a  permanent quad-oval racetrack. The race was extended from 130 laps from 134 due to a NASCAR overtime finish caused by a crash including Josh Reaume. After a costly mistake by Kyle Busch's pit crew before the final restart, Brett Moffitt of Hattori Racing Enterprises would steal and win the race- the first of the season and the 2nd of his career. To complete the podium, Noah Gragson of Kyle Busch Motorsports and Johnny Sauter of GMS Racing would finish 2nd and 3rd, respectively.

Background 

Atlanta Motor Speedway (formerly Atlanta International Raceway) is a track in Hampton, Georgia, 20 miles (32 km) south of Atlanta. It is a 1.54-mile (2.48 km) quad-oval track with a seating capacity of 111,000. It opened in 1960 as a 1.5-mile (2.4 km) standard oval. In 1994, 46 condominiums were built over the northeastern side of the track. In 1997, to standardize the track with Speedway Motorsports' other two 1.5-mile (2.4 km) ovals, the entire track was almost completely rebuilt. The frontstretch and backstretch were swapped, and the configuration of the track was changed from oval to quad-oval. The project made the track one of the fastest on the NASCAR circuit.

Practice

First practice 
First practice was held on Friday, February 23 at 3:00 PM EST.

Second and final practice 
The second and final practice was held on Friday, February 23 at 4:58 PM EST.

Qualifying 
Qualifying was held on Saturday, February 24 at 11:45 AM EST. The qualifying system was a single car, single lap, two round system where in the first round, everyone would set a time to determine positions 13-32. Then, the fastest 12 qualifiers would move on to the second round to determine positions 1-12. Kyle Busch, driving for his own team Kyle Busch Motorsports would set the fastest time in Round 2 to win the pole.

Race results 
Stage 1 Laps: 40

Stage 2 Laps: 40

Stage 3 Laps: 54

References 

2018 NASCAR Camping World Truck Series
NASCAR races at Atlanta Motor Speedway
February 2018 sports events in the United States
2018 in sports in Georgia (U.S. state)